John Norman is the pen name of John Frederick Lange Jr. (born 1931), American science fiction author.

John Norman may also refer to:
 John A. Norman (1883–1956), member of the Wisconsin State Assembly
 John Charles Norman (born 1966), graphic designer, advertising executive
 John Norman (mayor, fl. 1250), mayor of London
 John Norman (alderman) (1657-1724), English businessman and mayor of Norwich
 John Norman (draper), Lord Mayor of London
 John Norman (16th century MP), member of the parliament of England for York 
 John Norman (ice hockey) (born 1991), Swedish ice hockey player
 John Norman (publisher) (1748–1817), American engraver and publisher
 John Norman Jnr (born 1974), Canadian darts player
 John Roxborough Norman (1898–1944), British ichthyologist
 John Norman (Australian politician) (1855–1912), member of the Queensland Legislative Assembly
 John Paxton Norman (1819–1871), acting chief justice of the Calcutta High Court
 John Norman (cricketer) (born 1936), English cricketer
 John Norman (cyclist), British cyclist
 John David Norman (1927-2011), American sex offender and child sex trafficker

See also
 Jack Norman (1909–1994), Australian footballer